Mirrorball is a 1999 live album by Sarah McLachlan, compiled from performances during the Surfacing tour in 1997–98. Most of the 14 songs are from McLachlan's two most recent albums at the time, Fumbling Towards Ecstasy and Surfacing.  It was a commercial success, entering top 3 on both Billboard 200 and Canadian Albums Chart. 

The live performance of "I Will Remember You" was released as a single (the studio version having been released in 1995 and 1996) and was a commercial success, entering top 15 on both Billboard Hot 100 and Canadian Hot 100 charts.  It went on to win the Grammy Award for Best Female Pop Vocal Performance.

Track listing

Original release

Personnel 
 Sarah McLachlan – vocals, guitars, piano
 Ashwin Sood – drums, percussion, background vocals
 Brian Minato – bass guitar
 David Sinclair – guitars, background vocals
 Sean Ashby – guitars, background vocals
 Camille Henderson – background vocals
 Vincent Jones – keyboards, background vocals

Charts

Weekly charts

Year-end charts

Certifications and sales

Mirrorball: The Complete Concert 

Mirrorball: The Complete Concert is a two-disc expanded version of the album, collecting the same 14 songs and adding nine others. These performances were recorded during the final two nights of McLachlan's Surfacing tour, at the Rose Garden Arena in Portland, Oregon on 20–21 April 1998.

All tracks written by Sarah McLachlan, except where noted.

Disc One 

 "Building a Mystery" (McLachlan/Marchand) – 4:23
 "Plenty" – 3:19
 "Hold On" – 5:10
 "Good Enough" – 5:00
 "Do What You Have to Do" (McLachlan/Wolstenholme) – 4:07
 "Witness" (McLachlan/Marchand) – 4:43
 "Wait" – 4:48
 "I Will Remember You" (McLachlan/Egan/Merenda) – 3:33
 "Ice" – 4:39
 "I Love You" – 4:25
 "I Will Not Forget You" (McLachlan, Darren Phillips) – 5:43

Disc Two 

 "The Path of Thorns (Terms)" – 6:32
 "Mary" – 4:01
 "Adia" (McLachlan/Marchand) – 3:51
 "Fear" – 4:44
 "Elsewhere" – 5:05
 "Vox" – 5:11
 "Into the Fire" (McLachlan/Marchand) – 3:46
 "Possession" – 5:13
 "Ice Cream" – 4:38
 "Sweet Surrender" – 4:07
 "Fumbling Towards Ecstasy" (McLachlan/Marchand) – 6:04
 "Angel" – 6:11

References 

Sarah McLachlan live albums
1999 live albums
Nettwerk Records live albums
Arista Records live albums
Albums produced by Pierre Marchand